McPherson is a custom manufacturer of precision optical instruments and systems for measuring and characterizing spectra. McPherson instruments measure intensity vs. frequency in various regions of the electromagnetic spectrum. McPherson’s spectral test instruments are based on the dispersing properties of a diffraction grating and/or refractive prism.

McPherson specializes in vacuum fabrication, ultraviolet optical systems, spectroscopic technique, and high resolution spectral test and measurement instrumentation. End-user and OEM applications include research, metrology, semiconductors, pharmaceuticals, nanotechnology, aerospace and defense.

History
McPherson began manufacturing spectral test instrumentation in 19521. The company's first spectral test instruments were rocket born spectrometers used outside the earth’s atmosphere to study the vacuum ultraviolet portion of the solar spectrum.

Today, McPherson instruments are employed in laboratory environments around the world, for spectroscopic analysis in the infrared, visible, vacuum ultraviolet, and soft x-ray regions.

Company ownership
The Company was founded as McPherson Instrument Corporation by Paul McPherson (1920 - 1972) and operated as a sole proprietorship2 until 1967 when it was sold to now defunct GCA Corporation. It was operated as GCA/McPherson, a division of GCA Corporation, until 1981 when it was sold to D. M. Schoeffel. It has operated under various names: McPherson - Division of SI Corporation, McPherson Instruments, SI/McPherson and McPherson, Inc. Currently the company is simply called McPherson and remains a privately held company. It is headquartered in Chelmsford, Massachusetts USA.

Patents
Many McPherson instrument and system designs have been awarded US patents. Some of these include:

 Monochromator Adapted for use in the Ultraviolet Region (US Patent No. 3,090,863)3  This Auto-focusing Normal Incidence instrument is designed for use in the extreme ultraviolet and vacuum ultraviolet region (30 to 200 nm.) It has been modernized and is still in production.
 Ultraviolet Monochromator (US Patent No. 3,211,049)3  This grazing incidence Rowland circle instrument is designed for use in the soft x-ray and extreme ultraviolet spectral region (1 to 30 nm.) It has been modernized and is still in production.
 Optical Grating Spectral Dispersion System (US Patent No. 3,409,3743  This criss-cross Czerny Turner optical system is capable of operation from about 105 nm to 10 micrometers in the infrared and features (patented) interchangeable gratings and a vacuum tight housing. This is a modern instrument and remains in constant production to fill a high demand.

Additional patents (3,026,435) (3,161,769) (3,490,848) (3,433,557)3 for easily exchangeable optics, ultraviolet light sources and detectors have also been granted to McPherson.

McPherson instruments are employed in universities, research laboratories, and corporate research and development groups around the world, including: 3M Corporation (USA), Aarhus University (Denmark), Brookhaven National Laboratory (USA), Caltech (USA), Daresbury Laboratory (UK), Ecole Polytechnique (Switzerland), Food and Drug Administration (USA), General Electric (USA), Hasylab (Germany), IBM (USA), Joint European Torus (UK), KAIST (Korea), Los Alamos National Laboratory (USA), Massachusetts Institute of Technology (USA), National Institute of Standards and Technology (USA), etc.

References
 1Industry, official publication of Associated Industries of Massachusetts, August 1965
 2 Acton Beacon, April 1972
 3 United States Patent and Trademark Office

External links
 McPherson Official Website
 US Patent and Trademark Office

See also
 Spectroscopy
 Laboratory equipment
 Raman spectroscopy
 Infrared spectroscopy
 Spectrometer
 Monochromator
 Optics
 Spectrophotometry
 Optical instrument
 Scientific instrument

Technology companies established in 1952
Companies based in Massachusetts
Instrument-making corporations
1952 establishments in Massachusetts